Shesmu (alternatively Schesmu and Shezmu) is an ancient Egyptian deity with a contradictory character. He was worshiped from the early Old Kingdom period.

He was considered a god of ointments, perfume, and wine. In this role, he was associated with festivities, dancing, and singing. But he was also considered a god of blood, who could slaughter and dismember other deities. It is thought possible that the ancient Egyptians used red wine to symbolize blood in religious offerings, explaining why Shesmu is associated with both blood and wine.

Description 
Shesmu was seldom depicted but when he was he appeared as a man with a lion's head holding a butcher's knife. In later times he appeared as a lion. If only his name was mentioned it often appeared with the determinative of an oil press, and sometimes only the oilpress was depicted.

Worship 
Shesmu was a god with a contradictory personality. On one hand, he was lord of perfume, maker of all precious oil, lord of the oil press, lord of ointments and lord of wine. He was a celebration deity, like the goddess Meret. Old Kingdom texts mention a special feast celebrated for Shesmu: young men would press grapes with their feet and then dance and sing for Shesmu.

On the other hand, Shesmu was very vindictive and bloodthirsty. He was also lord of blood, great slaughterer of the gods, and he who dismembers bodies. In Old Kingdom Pyramid Texts, several prayers ask Shesmu to dismember and cook certain deities in an attempt to give the food to a deceased king. The deceased king needed the divine powers to survive the dangerous journey to the stars.

However, the interpretation remains open if the word "blood" is to be taken literally, as the ancient Egyptians symbolically offered red wine as "the blood of the gods" to several deities. This association was based simply on the dark red color of the wine, a circumstance that lead to connections of Shesmu with other deities who could appear in red colors. Examples include deities such as Ra, Horus, and Kherty. The violent character of Shesmu made him a protector among the companions of Ra's nocturnal barque. Shesmu protected Ra by threatening the demons and brawling with them. In the Pyramid Texts, he does similar things.

It appears that starting in the New Kingdom, Shesmu's negative attributes became gradually overshadowed by the positive ones, although on a 21st Dynasty papyri his wine press appears to be filled with human heads in place of grapes (a depiction which was common earlier, on Middle Kingdom Coffin Texts). Then later, on the 26th Dynasty sarcophagus of the Divine Adoratrice Ankhnesneferibre, Shesmu is recorded as a fine oil maker for the god Ra. And even later, during the Greco-Roman period, the manufacture of the finest oils and perfumes for the gods became Shesmu's primary role.

Cult 
Shesmu's main cult center was located at the Fayum. Later, there were further shrines erected at Edfu and Dendera.

References

External links

Deities of wine and beer
Egyptian gods
Lion deities
Fictional perfumers
Dance gods
Music and singing gods